, abbreviated as JPX or Nippon Torihikijo, is a Japanese "financial instruments exchange holding company" subject to the regulations of the Financial Instruments and Exchange Act enforced by the Financial Services Agency. JPX owns three licensed "financial instruments exchange" corporations: Tokyo Stock Exchange, Inc. (TSE), Osaka Exchange, Inc. (OSE), and Tokyo Commodity Exchange, Inc. (TOCOM). It was formed by the merger of TSE and OSE on January 1, 2013. As a result of this merger and market reorganization, TSE became the sole securities exchange of JPX and OSE became the largest derivatives exchange of JPX. In 2019, JPX acquired TOCOM to expand derivatives trading business in the commodity market. It also has an IT services and research arm, JPX Market Innovation & Research, Inc. (JPXI), a self-regulatory body, Japan Exchange Regulation (JPX-R), and a central clearing counterparty, Japan Securities Clearing Corporation (JSSC). As of June 2021, it is the world's fifth-largest stock exchange operator, behind NYSE, NASDAQ, SSE, and HKSE.

Timeline

 November 22, 2011 - TSE and OSE decided to merge into one, as a solution to slowing market conditions in Japan. 
 July 5, 2012 - The Japan Fair Trade Commission approved the TSE-OSE merger.
 January 1, 2013 - JPX was launched.
 January 4, 2013 - JPX was listed at TSE's First Section (8697). JPX also assumed OSE's own ticker symbol (also 8697).
 July 16, 2013 - The cash equity market of OSE was transferred and integrated into TSE. The self-regulatory operations of OSE were integrated into Tokyo Stock Exchange Regulation.  The derivatives clearing operations of OSE were integrated into Japan Securities Clearing Corporation. 
 October 1, 2013 - Japan Securities Clearing Corporation merged with Japan Government Bond Clearing Corporation. 
 March 24, 2014 - Osaka Securities Exchange Co., Ltd was renamed Osaka Exchange, Inc. The TSE derivatives market was transferred and integrated into OSE.
 April 1, 2014 - Tokyo Stock Exchange Regulation was renamed Japan Exchange Regulation.
 July 11, 2014 - JPX signed a comprehensive Memorandum of Understanding (MOU) with Bank of China Limited.
 November 1, 2014 - TSE and OSE opened a joint representative office in Hong Kong.
 December 4, 2014 - JPX concluded a Letter of Interest (LOI) with Singapore Exchange.
 December 23, 2014 - JPX signed a joint venture agreement with Daiwa Institute of Research Ltd., the research arm of Daiwa Securities Group, and Myanma Economic Bank to establish Yangon Stock Exchange.
 May 1, 2015 - TSE and OSE opened a joint branch office in Singapore.
 October 1, 2019 - JPX acquired Tokyo Commodity Exchange, Inc., which became a wholly owned subsidiary of the Group.
 November 25, 2021 - JPX launched a new subsidiary, JPX Market Innovation & Research, Inc. (JPXI), which would provide financial market data and index services and system-related services to financial data vendors. 
 April 1, 2022 - In order to strengthen business activities in the Kansai region, JPX established Osaka Head Office and Osaka IPO Center in the Osaka Securities Exchange Building at Kitahama, Osaka. The Osaka site would take over the entire operations of JPX in the event of a wide-ranging disaster in the National Capital Region. TSE and OSE transferred and integrated their data and digital businesses into JPXI. TSE also merged its IT services arm, Tosho System Service Co., Ltd. (TSS), into JPXI, which would inherit the rights and obligations of all business carried out by TSS, such as system development, operations, consulting, and telecommunication services.

Senior leadership 
The JPX has been led by a President & CEO (combined in one role) since its formation in 2013.

List of presidents and CEOs 

 Atsushi Saito (2013–2015)
 Akira Kiyota (2015–2023)
 Hiromi Yamaji (since April 2023)

Subsidiaries 
JPX is a corporate group formed by the holding company, Japan Exchange Group, Inc., and its subsidiaries:

 Tokyo Stock Exchange, Inc. (TSE) - operator of Tokyo Stock Exchange  
 Osaka Exchange, Inc. (OSE) - operator of Osaka Exchange
 Tokyo Commodity Exchange, Inc. (TOCOM) - operator of Tokyo Commodity Exchange
 JPX Market Innovation & Research, Inc. (JPXI) - IT services and research arm
 Japan Exchange Regulation (JPX-R) - self-regulatory body
 Japan Securities Clearing Corporation (JSSC) - clearing house
 Other consolidated subsidiaries

See also

 2013 in Japan
 List of commodities exchanges
 List of futures exchanges
 List of stock exchanges
 Yangon Stock Exchange

Notes

References 

 JPX Report 2022. Japan Exchange Group, Inc.

External links
  
  
  

 
Japanese companies established in 2013
Financial services companies based in Tokyo
Financial services companies established in 2013
Companies listed on the Osaka Exchange
Companies listed on the Tokyo Stock Exchange
Stock exchanges in Japan
Tokyo Stock Exchange
Holding companies of Japan